The Institute for History of Musical Reception and Interpretation (IMRI) is a musicological research institute at the University Mozarteum Salzburg.

Objectives 
The institute was founded in June 2006 by Joachim Brügge, Wolfgang Gratzer, and Thomas Hochradner and is concerned with selected topics on the interpretation and reception of music (in a project-related way). This should account for a self-concept of an Art University that sees musical practice and musicological reflection as equally creative activities that stimulate, correct and confirm each other.
Within the scope of a comprehensive music-historical approach, courses, projects, lectures, symposia, and publications of the institute's members deal with exemplary and symptomatic processes of musical interpretation and reception. An emphasis is put on the examination of Wolfgang Amadé Mozart's effective history.
The institute's name should reflect a distinction between forms of musical interpretation (artistic adaptations as performances or composed arrangements) and forms of musical reception (examination of music through science or press).

Institute’s series klang-reden
 2008
Mozart’s last three symphonies. Stations of their interpretational history (klang-reden 1), Joachim Brügge, Wolfgang Gratzer und Thomas Hochradner (eds.), Freiburg/Br.: Rombach

“Mozart” as challenge. Composing among the shades of canonical music (klang-reden 2), Wolfgang Gratzer (ed.), Freiburg/Br.: Rombach
 2009
Event “Klangrede”. Nikolaus Harnoncourt as conductor and music–thinker (klang-reden 3), Wolfgang Gratzer (ed.), Freiburg/Br.: Rombach

External links
 Institute's series klang-reden
 Joachim Brügge
 Wolfgang Gratzer
 Thomas Hochradner
 University Mozarteum Salzburg

Mozarteum University Salzburg
Musicology